Kerem Ersü (born 25 April 1967) is a Turkish archer. He competed at the 1988 Summer Olympics and the 1992 Summer Olympics.

References

1967 births
Living people
Turkish male archers
Olympic archers of Turkey
Archers at the 1988 Summer Olympics
Archers at the 1992 Summer Olympics
Place of birth missing (living people)
20th-century Turkish people